Ea Jansen (14 November 1921 – 20 April 2005) was an Estonian historian of Finno-Ugric history. Until her death, she worked for the Tallinn Pedagogical University.

Selected works
 1998, "From an Ethnic Community to National Statehood: The Case of Estonians" (article)

References

1921 births
2005 deaths
20th-century Estonian historians
Estonian Finno-Ugrists
Historians of Estonia
Estonian women historians
Recipients of the Order of the White Star, 4th Class
Soviet historians
Academic staff of Tallinn University
Estonian non-fiction writers
20th-century Estonian women writers
People from Tallinn
Writers from Tallinn